Bob Morgan is an American costume designer. He was nominated for an Academy Award in the category Best Costume Design for the film Dune.

Selected filmography 
 Dune (2021; co-nominated with Jacqueline West)

References

External links 

Living people
Place of birth missing (living people)
Year of birth missing (living people)
American costume designers